Göbelnrod is a village and urban district of Grünberg in the district of Gießen, in Hesse, Germany.

Geography 
Göbelnrod is situated 2 km west of Grünberg and 20 km east of Gießen.

Sights 
 Wirberg, a former monastery west of the village

History 
The village was first mentioned on December 5, 1310.

In documents of the 14th to 17th century the name appears in different spellings:
Gebelenrade (1310), Gebelinrode, Gebillinroda, Gebillinrode (all 1320), Gebilnrode (1457), Gebelnraide, Gebeinrade (both 1480), Gobelnrade (1484), Gabelnrade (about 1487), Gebelnrode (1495), Gobelnrode (1499), Gobelnroidt (1518), Gibbelnrode (1527), Göbelnroda (1629)

Population

Gallery

Societies 
 Carneval-Verein Göbelnrod 1973 e.V.
 Eintracht Fan-Club "Adlerkralle" Göbelnrod 1992
 Evangelische Frauenhilfe Göbelnrod, established 1932
 Freiwillige Feuerwehr Göbelnrod e.V., established 1952
 Gesangverein "Eintracht" Göbelnrod, established 1903
 Obst- und Gartenbauverein Göbelnrod, established 1936
 Sportverein 1927 Göbelnrod e.V.
 Tischtennisclub 1982 Göbelnrod

References

External links 
 700 years of Göbelnrod (German)
 private Website about Göbelnrod (German)
 City of Grünberg (German)
 Gazetteer of Hesse (German)

Villages in Hesse